Microsoft Private Folder was a product (withdrawn and discontinued shortly after its first release) created by a Microsoft employee and available as part of their "Windows Genuine Advantage" program. It allowed users to protect private data in a password protected folder called 'My Private Folder' in the user's account.

The software runs only on Windows XP and is blocked due to "compatibility reasons" under Windows Vista and later.

Usage
Microsoft Private Folder created a single folder on the user's desktop which, when opened for the first time, prompted the user to assign it a password. Every subsequent time the folder was opened, the user had to re-enter the same password to gain access. While the core implementation details of this service are not public, it is assumed  that Private Folder used strong encryption with a key based solely on this password to secure the data contained in the folder. This is in contrast to Microsoft's Encrypting File System, where encryption is tied to a keypair which can be made accessible to IT staff.

Private Folder used a system service called prfldrsvc (display name: Private Folder Service), the function of which is not yet publicly known.

References

2006 software
Private Folder